Daniel Philip Levy (born 8 February 1962) is a British businessman who is the current chairman of Premier League football club Tottenham Hotspur. He has held this post since 2001, making him the longest-serving chairman in the Premier League.

Early life
Levy was born in Essex, England, to Jewish parents. His father Barry Levy was the owner of a clothing retail business Mr Byrite (later rebranded as Blue Inc). He is a lifelong Tottenham Hotspur supporter, and attended his first match at White Hart Lane against QPR in the 1960s. He studied Economics and Land Economy at Sidney Sussex College, Cambridge, and graduated in 1985 with a First Class Honours Degree.

Career
After graduating, Levy went into his family business, Mr Byrite. He was also involved in property development, as well as a number of other businesses. He then formed a business association with Joe Lewis, and became involved in an investment trust called ENIC International Ltd that specialised in various sports (football in particular), entertainment and media. He was made the managing director of ENIC in 1995. Levy and his family own 29.4% of the share capital of ENIC, while Lewis owns 70.6%.

Levy became a director of the Scottish football club Rangers, in which ENIC held a significant stake until 2004. ENIC also held stakes in other European football clubs including AEK Athens, Slavia Prague, FC Basel and Vicenza (but all since sold), as well as non-football companies such as Warner Bros Restaurants and a Cambridge software company, Autonomy. He became chairman of Tottenham Hotspur in 2001.

Tottenham Hotspur
Levy made an attempt to buy Tottenham Hotspur from Alan Sugar in July 1998 but failed. Another attempt was made in July 2000 but that was again rejected, however, increasing hostility by fans towards Sugar eventually persuaded Sugar to sell. Levy was then appointed to the board of Tottenham Hotspur on 20 December 2000 after ENIC initiated the purchase of a 27% stake in the club from Sugar for £22 million bringing their total stake to 29.9%, the maximum permissible before ENIC had to bid for the entire company. He replaced Sugar as chairman of Tottenham Hotspur in February 2001 on the completion of the sale, and took over the day-to-day running of the club in October 2001. ENIC would eventually substantially increase their shareholding and gain control of the company after buying the remaining shares off Sugar in 2007 for £25m, as well as those of other shareholders, eventually acquiring 85.55% of Tottenham. ENIC moved the club into the private ownership in 2012. Levy became the highest paid Premier League chief executive, with an annual remuneration of over £6 million in the 2016–17 season.

Managers 
The first manager appointed with Levy at the helm was Glenn Hoddle in 2001. Hoddle however was sacked following a poor start to the 2003–04 season in September 2003. He was followed in quick succession by Jacques Santini and Martin Jol. Jol had some success moving Tottenham out of the mid-table, but was dismissed in the 2007–08 season  after the team only won one game in the first ten games.

Juande Ramos succeeded as head coach in 2008. He delivered the League Cup, the first trophy under Levy's stewardship and the club's first in nine years, but Levy made the decision to replace him with Harry Redknapp on 25 October 2008 after Ramos made the worst start to a league campaign in the club's history in the 2008–09 season. Redknapp guided Spurs to a top four finish in the 2009–10 season, winning their entry into the qualification round of the UEFA Champions League for the first time. Tottenham reached the knock-out stages in the 2010–11 UEFA Champions League but eventually lost to Real Madrid. Tottenham finished fifth in the Premier League in the 2010–11 season, missing out on Champions' League qualification but securing a place in the Europa League. On 13 June 2012, Redknapp was relieved of his duties after failing to agree terms for a new deal.

On 3 July Levy appointed former Chelsea and Porto boss Andre Villas-Boas as the team's new head coach. Following some poor results in the first half of the 2013–14 season, including a 5–0 home defeat by Liverpool, Levy sacked Villas-Boas on 16 December 2013. Head of Football Development and former player Tim Sherwood was subsequently announced as head coach, but he also left at the end of the season.

On 27 May 2014, Levy appointed Southampton manager Mauricio Pochettino as head coach. The team reached the 2015 Football League Cup Final in Pochettino's first season in charge which also saw a number of the club's academy players step up to establish themselves in the first team, including Harry Kane, Ryan Mason, Nabil Bentaleb and Andros Townsend. His team qualified for Europe with a fifth-place finish in 2014–15 before challenging for the Premier League title in the 2015–16 and 2016–17 seasons with a squad consisting of the youngest average age in the division. They also achieved their best ranking in 2016–17 since the 1962–63 season under Bill Nicholson. The team have been ranked among the top 4 since the 2015–16 season, allowing them to qualify and participate in the Champions League since 2016–17. They reached the final for the first time in 2018–19, but lost to Liverpool in the 2019 UEFA Champions League Final.

On 19 November 2019, Pochettino was sacked as manager of Spurs and was replaced the following day by José Mourinho. However, after only 17 months on the job, Mourinho was sacked on 19 April 2021 after a spate of losses and a disappointing second half of the 2020–21 season.

For the rest of the season, Ryan Mason was interim manager and lost to Manchester City in the League Cup Final in 2021.

On 30 June 2021, Levy appointed Nuno Espírito Santo as the head coach for Tottenham on a two year deal. Espírito Santo was sacked on 1 November 2021 following a run of poor results which saw Tottenham lose four in six Premier League games. On 2 November 2021, Levy appointed Antonio Conte as head coach on an 18 month deal, with an option to extend. The team's form dramatically improved under Conte's reign and resulted in Tottenham qualifying for the UEFA Champions League for the first time since the 2019-20 campaign.

Finance and negotiations
Levy is noted for maintaining a relatively modest wage structure at Tottenham compared to the other big 6 clubs of the Premier League; the club spent the least on wages among the top 6 clubs in the 2018–19 season, and it had the lowest wage/revenue percentage of all clubs in the Premier League. Levy has described the spending by other clubs in the Premier League as unsustainable. In the 2017–18 season, Tottenham made a profit of £113 million (£138.9m pre-tax), a world record for a football club. The club was valued at around £80 million when ENIC first attempted to buy a stake in 1998, and by 2019, valuations of the club have ranged between £1.3–1.8 billion.

Levy is the chief negotiator in the transfer of players for Tottenham. He has acquired a reputation for tough negotiation in the club's transfer dealings; former Manchester United manager Sir Alex Ferguson described negotiating with Levy over the transfer of Dimitar Berbatov as "more painful than my hip replacement". In 2013, Levy negotiated a then world record fee of £86 million for the transfer of Gareth Bale to Real Madrid. Levy is particularly known for his last-minute dealings on the last day of the transfer window, with notable examples including the signings of Rafael van der Vaart and Hugo Lloris. He is also known to target young players, in the hopes of developing them into major stars; this strategy has seen such successes as Gareth Bale, Christian Eriksen, Son Heung-min and Dele Alli. 

Levy has been criticised by Tottenham supporters and pundits alike for not investing more money in the transfer market; in the first four years of Pochettino's tenure as Spurs manager, the club had a net spend of £29 million on transfer fees, considerably lower than the other major clubs in the same period. In 2018, Tottenham became the first Premier League club to make no signings during a summer transfer window.

Levy has been instrumental in attracting corporate partners to the club in multi-million pound sponsorship deals including current partners Nike and AIA. He negotiated multiple shirt sponsorships in 2010 when he agreed a deal with software infrastructure company Autonomy as the club's shirt sponsor in the Premier League, with Investec becoming shirt sponsor for Champions League and domestic cup competitions.

Levy has also promoted governance issues related to the Premier League, most recently advocating enhanced financial controls for all owners to ensure the long-term financial stability of clubs.  In 2007, he lobbied successfully for clubs to be allowed to name seven players on the substitute bench, in order to encourage the inclusion of young players; the change was ratified in February 2008.

Club training ground
In 2012, the club moved to its new training base set in 80 acres of greenbelt land. Planning and construction of the facility took over seven years and a player accommodation lodge was added later. The Brazil national team stayed at the Lodge to prepare for the 2018 World Cup.

New stadium
Levy oversaw the construction of a new, larger stadium adjacent to and replacing the White Hart Lane site, from its design to the construction. The Northumberland Development Project was announced in 2008, with the building of a new club stadium at its centrepiece. After some delay, the construction of the new venue started in 2015. The stadium was designed with an initial capacity of 62,062, making it the largest club stadium in London and the second largest in the country. The project is intended to be a catalyst for the regeneration of Tottenham to bring new jobs and homes to the area.

For the 2017–18 season, Levy negotiated the club's move to Wembley Stadium for one year to allow demolition of the old venue and the completion of a new stadium on the same site as the White Hart Lane. During their time at Wembley, the club also broke the Premier League attendance record several times, as well as Champions League attendance record for a British club.

The construction officially opened on 3 April 2019 branded as Tottenham Hotspur Stadium. It includes the world's first dividing retractable pitch to accommodate other leading sports, notably American football, and entertainment events. The design allowed the club to agree a ten-year deal to host NFL matches at their new home from 2018. The stadium is reported to have cost £1.2 billion, and a financial analysis in February 2021 indicated that construction of the stadium is largely responsible for burdening Tottenham with a £1.177 billion debt, the biggest debt of all European clubs.

Awards
In November 2017, Levy was named CEO of the Year at the Football Business Awards.

Personal life
Levy is Jewish. He is married to his former PA, Tracy Dixon, and they have four children.

References

External links
Daniel Levy at tottenhamhotspur.com

Living people
1962 births
Alumni of Sidney Sussex College, Cambridge
English Jews
English businesspeople
Tottenham Hotspur F.C. directors and chairmen
Rangers F.C. non-playing staff